Trichardt School for Christian Education, colloquially known as Sul Africana is a Christian highschool located in the suburb of Coop in Maputo, Mozambique. The school was founded in 1992 and currently runs its operations from the premises of the football club Estrela Vermelha.

The school administers the South African IEB curriculum having an academic year that starts in January and ends in December.

Notable alumni
  Evangelos Vellios, Amatuks Assistant Coach & TuksFootball Technical Director

Schools in Maputo